Park Lane by Splendor is a shopping center located in West District, Taichung, Taiwan. The mall opened on January 18, 2012 and is located in the lower floors of The Splendor Hotel Taichung. Main core stores of the mall include Muji, Eslite Bookstore, Studio A, and various themed restaurants.

History 
 Park Lane by Splendor officially opened on January 18, 2012.
 In September 2017, the  space on the third floor of the mall was renovated and transformed into the Taichung Sixth Market. It houses 50 stalls and became Taiwan's first exquisite traditional market located inside a shopping mall.

See also
 List of tourist attractions in Taiwan
 The Splendor Hotel Taichung
 Park Lane by CMP

References

External Links

2012 establishments in Taiwan
Shopping malls established in 2012
Shopping malls in Taichung
Buildings and structures in Taichung
Tourist attractions in Taichung